Chuck Sorensen (born August 14, 1972, in the United States) is an American motorcycle racer.

By season

Races by year

(key)

External links
http://www.motogp.com/en/riders/Chuck+Sorensen

1972 births
Living people
American motorcycle racers
250cc World Championship riders